Dina Ezz El-Dine Zulfikar (Egyptian Arabic: دينا ذو الفقار, ; born April 22, 1962) is an Egyptian environmentalist, film distributor and animal, wildlife rights activist. She is a member of the Animal welfare and rights in the Netherlands.

Early life and education 
Dina Zulfikar was born in 1962 in Zamalek district of Cairo, to Ezz El-Dine Zulfikar, filmmaker, previously a military officer and Kawthar Shafika, actress. She had a great sympathy towards animals in her childhood. Her activism began while she was a student at Cairo University. Zulfikar teamed up with her childhood friend Amina Abaza and together they established SPARE Animal Welfare Society.

Career 
Zulfikar graduated from Cairo University in 1983, majoring in Business Administration. She worked in the US Military Cooperation Office in Egypt, and established the Arab Celebrity website. She also owned a film distribution company in Egypt and France, and then devoted herself entirely to animal rights. Recently, Dina Zulfikar called for the inclusion of articles in the Egyptian constitution for the welfare of animals and the preservation of wildlife. She also called for improving the living conditions of animals in zoos and for the application of international standards. She became one of Egypt's most determined and dedicated animal welfare advocates.

See also 
 Animal Welfare in Egypt
 List of animal rights advocates

References 

1963 births
21st-century Egyptian women
Egyptian activists
Animal rights activists
Living people